Tom Jones (born February 17, 1928) is an American lyricist and librettist, best known for The Fantasticks, 110 in the Shade, and  I Do! I Do!. He was born in Littlefield, Texas.

Career
Jones' best-known work is The Fantasticks, which ran off-Broadway from 1960 until 2002, and the hit song from the same, "Try to Remember". Other songs from The Fantasticks include "Soon It's Gonna Rain", "Much More", and "I Can See It". He also wrote the screenplay for the 1995 feature-film adaptation.

Jones acted in a New York City revival of The Fantasticks, which he also directed.  He played the part of the Old Actor, from when the musical opened in 1960, and from April 26, 2010, to June 6, 2010.  He was credited as an actor in the show as Thomas Bruce. 

Jones is also the author of Making Musicals: An Informal Introduction to the World of Musical Theater, about which Elyse Sommer wrote on January 15, 1998 in CurtainUp:

Extremely well organized and packed with interesting information, the first half of the book deals in broad and general terms with the growth and development of the American musical. The second half focuses on the practical "how-to" of putting together a musical, using Jones's own career and shows he's worked on as a springboard ... Since only half the book falls within the category of how-to I'm glad to report that this advice is stick-to-the-ribs solid. No hyperbole. No gratuitous name dropping.

All of Jones's major musicals were written with Harvey Schmidt, whom he met at the University of Texas at Austin.

Theater credits
 Shoestring '57 (contributor) (1957)
 Demi-Dozen (contributor) (1958)
 The Fantasticks (1960) 
 110 in the Shade (book by N. Richard Nash, based on his play The Rainmaker) (1963)
 I Do! I Do! (based on The Fourposter by Jan de Hartog) (1966)
 Celebration (1969)
 Colette (1970)
 Philemon (1973)
 Grover's Corners (based on Our Town) (1987)
 Mirette (book by Elizabeth Diggs, based on the children's book Mirette on the High Wire by Emily Arnold McCully) (1996)
 Roadside (book by Jones, based on the 1929 play of the same name by Lynn Riggs, with music by Harvey Schmidt) (2001 off-Broadway (York Theatre))
 Harold and Maude (2004; music by Joseph Thalken, based on the film)
 The Game of Love (music by Offenbach with arrangements and additional music by Nancy Ford, based on the Anatol plays by Arthur Schnitzler).

References

External links

 (archive)
Tom Jones Downstage Center XM radio interview at American Theatre Wing, September 2006
Philemon at The Guide to Musical Theatre
Roadside at The Guide to Musical Theatre

1928 births
Living people
American musical theatre librettists
American musical theatre lyricists
Broadway composers and lyricists
University of Texas at Austin alumni
People from Littlefield, Texas
Writers from Texas
Songwriters from Texas